This is the list of works by Ramin Djawadi, an Iranian-German composer and music producer.

Djawadi has composed and produced over one hundred soundtracks and film scores for both film and TV. He is best known for the score of HBO's series, Game of Thrones, along with other shows like Prison Break, Person of Interest and Westworld. He is also known for movie scores like Pacific Rim, Iron Man, and Warcraft. He also worked alongside Ellie Goulding for her song "Hollow Crown" in the album For the Throne: Music Inspired by the HBO Series Game of Thrones. Djawadi won two Emmy Awards in the category Outstanding Music Composition for a Series for his work on the soundtracks of season 7 and season 8 of Game of Thrones in 2018 and 2019. He was also nominated for Grammy Awards in 2009, 2018, and 2020.

Discography

Films

2000s

2010s

2020s

Television

Television series

Video games

Concert tours

Awards

References

External links 
 

Discographies of classical composers
Discographies of German artists
Discographies of Iranian artists
Film and television discographies
Lists of compositions by composer
List of works